The EG Awards of 2011 are the sixth Annual The Age EG (Entertainment Guide) Awards and took place at the Prince Bandroom on 23 November 2011.

Hall of Fame inductees
Hoodoo Gurus and Stephen 'The Ghost' Walker.

Award nominees and winners
Winners indicated below in boldface

References

2011 in Australian music
2011 music awards
Music Victoria Awards